Mai-Aini Subregion is a subregion in the Debub region of Eritrea.

References
Mai-Aini

Southern Region (Eritrea)
Subregions of Eritrea